Antonella Attili (born 3 April 1963) is an Italian film and television actress.

Selected filmography

References

External links

1963 births
Living people
Italian film actresses
Italian television actresses
Actresses from Rome
20th-century Italian actresses
21st-century Italian actresses